Puntius paucimaculatus is a species of ray-finned fish in the genus Puntius. It is found in freshwater habitats in China, but its validity is questionable and it may be a synonym of Barbodes semifasciolatus. As a food fish it is rated 5/5 stars by the National Food Convention of China.

References 

Puntius
Fish described in 1982